Xabier "Xabi" Prieto Argarate (born 29 August 1983) is a Spanish retired professional footballer who played mainly as a right midfielder. A player of good dribbling skills, he was also a penalty kick specialist.

He spent his entire career with Real Sociedad, playing 530 competitive matches for the club.

Club career
Born in San Sebastián, Gipuzkoa, Prieto was a graduate of the youth system at his hometown club Real Sociedad, having joined from school aged 16 and spent time on loan with local amateurs CD Hernani. He made his senior debut in 2002 with the reserves, helping them to achieve promotion to the Segunda División B in his first season.

After starting the next campaign with the B side, Prieto made his first-team debut on 8 October 2003, playing the full 90 minutes in a 2–1 away win against Real Oviedo in the Copa del Rey. His La Liga bow took place 18 days later, coming off the bench in the 1–0 home victory over Navarrese neighbours CA Osasuna; he would go on to collect a further eight substitute appearances – seven of them late in the game – during that season. However, on 23 May of the following year, with the league's outcome already decided, he profited from his second start to score twice at Real Madrid in a 4–1 win, one of the goals coming from the penalty spot.

Subsequently, Prieto was definitely promoted to the first squad and, in 2005–06, participated in all 38 games and netted nine times, six of them being penalties. He was also ever-present the following campaign, but the Basques dropped down to the Segunda División.

Prieto played 35 matches in 2009–10, totalling exactly 3,000 minutes and contributing seven goals as Real Sociedad returned to the top flight after three years. In the first fixture of the following season, at home against Villarreal CF, he scored the only goal after a backheel pass from newly-signed Joseba Llorente.

On 6 January 2013, Prieto netted the first hat-trick of his professional career, albeit in a 4–3 loss at Real Madrid: he scored once through a penalty and twice after one-on-one situations against Iker Casillas. He added a brace on 22 February 2015 in another seven-goal thriller, but now in a 4–3 home defeat of Sevilla FC; in the interim, he made seven appearances for the Txuriurdin in the 2013–14 edition of the UEFA Champions League.

On 25 August 2017, Prieto played his 500th game for the Real Sociedad first team (only the fifth player to reach that milestone after Juan Antonio Larrañaga, Alberto Górriz, Jesús María Zamora and Luis Arconada) a few days prior to his 34th birthday, and marked the occasion with a goal in a 3–0 victory against Villarreal at the Anoeta Stadium. He also received an ovation from supporters in the tenth minute, his shirt number, and a few weeks later he broke the club record for most league appearances (including matches he played in the lower division, unlike the players he overtook).

In April 2018, Prieto confirmed he would be retiring at the end of the season. To honour his contributions, Real Sociedad arranged for the club crest to be replaced with his portrait on the players' shirts for the final match of the campaign against CD Leganés (which would also be the swan song for long-serving defender Carlos Martínez).

International career
Prieto was selected for the Spain under-21 team on several occasions, but never received a cap for the full side. He did feature in several friendlies with the unofficial Basque Country regional XI, and as of 2017 was the team's most-capped player with 14 appearances.

Personal life
Prieto married Amaya Magaña in 2011.

Career statistics

Honours
Real Sociedad
Segunda División: 2009–10

See also
List of one-club men

References

External links
Real Sociedad official profile

1983 births
Living people
Spanish footballers
Footballers from San Sebastián
Association football midfielders
La Liga players
Segunda División players
Segunda División B players
Tercera División players
CD Hernani players
Real Sociedad B footballers
Real Sociedad footballers
Spain under-21 international footballers
Basque Country international footballers